Protobothrops kaulbacki, commonly known as the Kaulback's lance-headed pitviper or Kaulback's lance-headed pit viper, is a venomous pit viper species endemic to Asia. No subspecies are currently recognized.

Etymology
The specific name, kaulbacki, is in honor of British explorer Ronald Kaulback.

Description
Females may grow longer: maximum total length , tail . Dorsally, it is green, with a vertebral series of dark angular spots, which may be joined to form a zigzag stripe. The top of the head is black with yellow stripes. Ventrally, except for the whitish throat area, it is gray with large squarish or crescent-shaped yellow spots. Scalation includes 25 rows of dorsal scales at midbody, 201–212 ventral scales, 66–78 subcaudal scales, and 8 supralabial scales of which the third is the largest.

Geographic range
Protobothrops kaulbacki had originally been known only from the type locality, which is "Pangnamdim, north of the Triangle, Upper Burma" (Myanmar). In 2005 it was reported also from Tibet (China). It also occurs in Arunachal Pradesh (NE India).

Reproduction
Protobothrops kaulbacki is oviparous. The adult female lays a clutch of 6–32 eggs in a hole in the ground, and then remains with the eggs to guard them. Eggs measure 48–53 mm x 26–27 mm (about 2 in x 1 in). Each hatchling is 26–27 cm (about 10½ inches) in total length.

References

Further reading
Kraus, Fred; Mink, Daniel G.; Brown, Wesley M. (1996). "Crotaline Intergeneric Relationships Based on Mitochondrial DNA Sequence Data". Copeia 1996 (4): 763–773. (Protobothrops kaulbacki, new combination).
Smith MA (1940). "The Amphibians and Reptiles obtained by Mr. Ronald Kaulback in Upper Burma". Records of the Indian Museum 42: 465–486. (Protobothrops kaulbacki, new species, p. 485, Plate VIII, Figure 5).

kaulbacki
Snakes of China
Reptiles of India
Reptiles of Myanmar
Fauna of Tibet
Reptiles described in 1940
Taxa named by Malcolm Arthur Smith